Resnova humifusa is a species of flowering plant in the Asparagaceae family. It is a bulbous perennial plant found in South Africa.

The homoisoflavanone 5,6-dimethoxy-7-hydroxy-3-(4′-hydroxybenzyl)-4-chromanone can be found in the bulbs of R. humifusa.

References

External links 
 

Scilloideae
Flora of South Africa
Taxa named by John Gilbert Baker
Taxa named by Ute Müller-Doblies
Taxa named by Dietrich Müller-Doblies